United Nations Security Council Resolution 70, adopted on March 7, 1949, requested that the Secretary-General inform the Council of  all reports and petitions received from or relating to strategic areas under trusteeship and requested that the Trusteeship Council  submit to the Council its reports and recommendations for political, economic, social and educational matters affecting strategic areas under trusteeship.

The resolution was approved with eight votes to none, with Egypt, the Ukrainian SSR and Soviet Union abstaining.

See also
List of United Nations Security Council Resolutions 1 to 100 (1946–1953)

References
Text of the Resolution at undocs.org

External links
 

 0070
United Nations Trusteeship Council
March 1949 events